Vladimir Kuznetsov (born ) is a Soviet male former weightlifter, who competed in the middleweight class and represented Soviet Union at international competitions. He won the silver medal at the 1983 World Weightlifting Championships in the 75 kg category.

References

1963 births
Living people
Soviet male weightlifters
World Weightlifting Championships medalists
Place of birth missing (living people)